Banknotes of the Australian pound were first issued by numerous private banks in Australia, starting with the Bank of New South Wales in 1817. Acceptance of private bank notes was not made compulsory by legal tender laws but they were widely used and accepted. The Queensland government issued treasury notes (1866–1869) and banknotes (1893–1910), which were legal tender in Queensland. The New South Wales government issued a limited series of Treasury Notes in 1893.

In 1910, the Commonwealth passed the Australian Notes Act of 1910 to initiate banking and currency reform. The Act stipulated that six months after the date of passage (16 September 1910), private banks could no longer issue any form of money, and that any note or instrument issued by a State Bank would no longer be considered legal tender. The Act further established the powers of the Commonwealth to issue, re-issue, and cancel Australian notes. The Act also established denominations, legal tender status, and the amount of gold coin held in reserve to secure the issues. On 10 October 1910 (prior to the effective date of the Notes Act), a Bank Notes Tax Act 1910 imposed a "Ten pounds per centum" tax on all issued or re-issued bank notes. A third currency reform act was passed on 22 December 1911 establishing the Commonwealth Bank. The Commonwealth Bank Act of 1911 specifically stated that the bank was not to issue bills or notes for circulation. The Australian Treasury issued banknotes until a 1920 amendment to the Commonwealth Bank Act of 1911. The amendment established a note-issuing department within the bank which assumed those responsibilities previously held by the Treasury.

On 14 February 1966 the Australian pound was replaced by a decimal currency, the Australian dollar, which was divided into one hundred cents.

Superscribed banknotes (1910–1914)

The first national issue of paper money (known as Superscribed banknotes) consisted of overprinted notes from fifteen private banks and the Queensland government, issued between 1910 and 1914 in denominations of £1, £5, £10, £20, £50 and £100. The notes, purchased by the Australian government from the remaining private bank stock, were overprinted with the words "Australian note". Surviving notes above the £10 denomination are extremely rare:  two £20 notes are known (privately held), £50 notes are known in the collections of the Reserve Bank of Australia and the Art Gallery of South Australia, and no £100 banknotes of this series are known to exist.

Commonwealth banknotes of the Australian pound
In 1913 the first national banknotes were introduced in denominations of 10s, £1, £5, and £10. 1914 saw the introduction of £20, £50, £100, and £1000 notes. The £1000 note only saw limited circulation and was later confined to inter-bank use. Stocks were destroyed in 1969 and there are no uncancelled examples of this note known to exist in private hands, though a single cancelled example sold in a 2007 auction for AU$1,200,000.

Design alterations were introduced fairly quickly. Beginning in 1915, 10s notes included a red "Half Sovereign" overprint. Banknote size was reduced for the £1 (1923), £5 (1924), and £10 (1925). A portrait of King George V was introduced in the mid-1920s on the 10s through £10 notes. These notes still referred to the currency's convertibility to gold on demand. A newer £1000 note (1923–1928) with the profile of George V was also prepared but never issued. A punch-cancelled specimen note was discovered in London in 1996 and subsequently sold for a sum in excess of $200,000. Nonetheless, this note is not recognised as a legitimate Australian banknote issue.

Just after the start of the Great Depression in 1933, Australian currency ceased to be redeemable for gold at the previously maintained rate of one gold sovereign for one pound currency. Subsequently, a new series of legal tender notes were designed, once again bearing the portrait of King George V, in denominations of 10s, £1, £5 and £10. These denominations and designs were maintained and modified to accommodate the portrait of King George VI in 1938. For both issues £50 and £100 specimens were prepared, but were not issued.

Issuance of the Australian pound banknote (1913–1965)

References

Footnotes

Notes

Bibliography

Currencies of Australia
Banknotes of Australia
Modern obsolete currencies
1966 disestablishments in Australia
Pound, Australian
1910 establishments in Australia